Merchant of Death, death merchants, or variations may refer to:

War, death, arms, and weaponry
 Merchants of death, a phrase used to describe war industry and their funders
 Arms industry, nicknamed "merchants of death"
 arms dealer, a weapons merchant
 hitman, assassin-for-hire

People
 Viktor Bout (born 1967), Russian arms dealer nicknamed the Merchant of Death
 Sarkis Soghanalian (1929-2011), international private arms dealer nicknamed the Merchant of Death
 Basil Zaharoff (1849-1936), Greek arms dealer nicknamed the Merchant of Death
 Alfred Nobel (1833-1896), Swedish businessman who invented dynamite and established the Nobel Prize, nicknamed "the Merchant of Death"
 Sarkis Soghanalian, an Armenian Cold War arms dealer and businessman

Fictional characters
 Death Merchant, Weisheit, a fictional character from the 2006 videogame Wild Arms XF

Literature
 The Merchant of Death, 2002 fantasy novel in the Pendragon series by D.J. MacHale 
 Death Merchant, action-adventure novels by Joseph Rupert Rosenberger
 Death Merchant Chronicles, a series of novels by Christopher Moore
 Death Merchants, 2003 action-adventure story by Tim Tresslar in the Executioner series, see List of Mack Bolan books
 Diagnosis Murder: The Death Merchant, a medical mystery novel by Lee Goldberg, in the media franchise Diagnosis: Murder
 Merchants of Death, a comic book title published by Eclipse Comics, see List of Eclipse Comics publications
 Merchants of Death, a manga episode chapter of Cyborg 009
 Merchant of Death: Money, Guns, Planes, and the Man Who Makes War Possible, 2007 non-fiction book by Douglas Farah and Stephen Braun about arms dealer Victor Bout
 El mercader de la muerte, 2020 novel about Basil Zaharoff by Gervasio Posadas Mañé

Music
 "Death Merchants", 2011 song by Sutter Kain and Darko off the album Mask of the Demon
 "Merchants of Death", 2002 song by Manila Road off the album Spiral Castle
 "Merchant of Death", 2008 instrumental by Ramin Djawadi from the movie soundtrack Iron Man
 "Merchants of Death", 2020 song by Havok off the album V

Television
 "The Death Merchant", 1966 episode of the TV series The Time Tunnel
 "Merchants of Death", 1983 season 2 number 4 episode 26 of Knight Rider
 "Merchants of Death", 1975 season 4 number 11 episode 83 of The Streets of San Francisco
 "Merchant of Death", 1961 season 1 episode 4 of Top Secret
 "The Merchant of Death", 1988 season 1 episode 16 of Wiseguy
 "The Merchant of Death: Viktor Bout", 2019 season 3 number 7 of the documentary TV series Declassified

Other uses
 The Undertaker (1988 film), also released as Death Merchant

See also

 Death (personification)
 Merchant (disambiguation)
 Death (disambiguation)